Schalk Willem Petrus Burger Snr. (born 6 October 1955) is a South African former rugby union player.

Playing career

Burger was born in Cape Town and received his schooling in Paarl, at Paarl Gimnasium. In 1973 het represented the  schools rugby team at the Craven Week tournament. During the period 1979 to 1983, Burger played 72 matches for Eastern Province, including 40 as captain. In 1984 he returned to Western Province.

Burger made his test match debut for the Springboks against the visiting England team on 2 June 1984 in Port Elizabeth. In 1986 he played in the four test matches against the New Zealand Cavaliers. Burger was capped 6 times for the Springboks.

Test history

Personal
Burger is the father of Schalk Burger, a former Springbok Loose-forward and Springbok Captain.

Accolades
Burger was one of the five nominees for 1985 SA Rugby player of the Year award. The other nominees for the award were Jannie Breedt, Gerrie Sonnekus, Danie Gerber and the eventual winner of the award, Naas Botha.

See also
List of South Africa national rugby union players – Springbok no. 535

References

1955 births
Living people
South African rugby union players
South Africa international rugby union players
Western Province (rugby union) players
Rugby union locks
Alumni of Paarl Gimnasium
Rugby union players from Cape Town